Oreste Arpè (18 June 1889 – July 1977) was an Italian wrestler. He competed in the light heavyweight event at the 1912 Summer Olympics.

References

External links
 

1889 births
1977 deaths
Olympic wrestlers of Italy
Wrestlers at the 1912 Summer Olympics
Italian male sport wrestlers
People from La Spezia
Sportspeople from the Province of La Spezia